Onandi Lowe (born 2 December 1974), also known as Nandi, is a Jamaican former international footballer who played in every outfield position, but was best known as a prolific forward. He spent some of his career in the top flight Jamaica National Premier League as well as having stints in North America and England. He scored 27 goals in 65 international appearances and appeared at the 1998 FIFA World Cup. However, he found himself on the wrong side of the law with drugs in the latter part of his career, and has been described as "one of Jamaica's most controversial players". His son, Damion Lowe, is also a professional footballer.

He started his career at Harbour View, before joining Canadian side Montreal Impact in 1996. He returned to Jamaica with Waterhouse the following year, before signing with American side Richmond Kickers via Arnett Gardens in 1999. He then helped Rochester Raging Rhinos to win the A-League in 2000. He joined Kansas City Wizards the following year, and also had a brief spell on loan at English side Port Vale. He did though sign with Rushden & Diamonds in February 2002, and hit 49 goals in 90 league games for the club. He transferred to Coventry City in March 2004, before returning to Jamaican side Arnett Gardens later in the year following his arrest by British police. He later played for Portmore United, Miami FC, and Arnett Gardens again, before he retired in 2008.

Club career
After leaving Dunoon Technical High in his hometown of Kingston, Lowe joined Harbour View, a top Jamaican club, in 1993. A big, versatile free-kick specialist who could play anywhere on the pitch and was known for his strong left foot, Lowe moved to Canada in 1996 to join Montreal Impact. He helped Impact to the A-League's Northeast Division final in 1997, scoring twice against Toronto Lynx in the semi-finals. He returned to Jamaica after two seasons with Impact, joining Waterhouse and then Arnett Gardens. He moved back to the A-League with Richmond Kickers, scoring 15 goals and gaining seven assists in 1999. He played for Rochester Raging Rhinos in 2000, and scored in the tournament's final, in a 3–1 win over Minnesota Thunder at Frontier Field.

In 2001, he tried his luck in Europe, joining Port Vale on loan for the end of the 2000–01 season. However his deal at Vale Park was not made permanent after he quit the club when chairman Bill Bell refused to provide him with a car; when a reporter asked if he was upset about paying the wages of a player that had absconded, Bell replied "dunner worry kid, we won't be paying him". He scored two goals for Port Vale, the first against Darlington in the Football League Trophy; Vale would go on to win the trophy in his absence. He also scored once in a league game, against Cambridge United. He spent the rest of the year with Kansas City Wizards, and scored eight goals in 20 games.

Lowe joined Rushden & Diamonds of the Football League Third Division on loan in December 2001, then signed permanently with "Diamonds" in February 2002. He spent two years with the club, during which time he made close to 100 appearances, keeping a goalscoring rate of better than one every two games, making him a crowd favourite at Nene Park. This record includes a hat-trick against Mansfield Town at Field Mill on 30 March 2002, as part of the club's run to the play-off Final, which ended in a 3–1 defeat to Cheltenham Town at the Millennium Stadium. He went on to score 16 goals in 42 games in 2002–03, as the club finished as the division's champions. Moving on to Coventry City in March 2004, he got off to a bad start with manager Eric Black after failing to report for duty following an international game. He scored once against Crewe Alexandra in two matches before he was released at the end of the 2003–04 season due to his ongoing drug trial.

Returning to Jamaica with old club Arnett Gardens, he attempted to return to England with Peterborough United in March 2005 and ran into problems gaining a work permit; rejection for his permit also prevented him a move to Oxford United later in the year. He started the 2006 season with Miami FC in the US, only to be released after a month because of disciplinary problems. After two years with Portmore United he rejoined Arnett in the Jamaica National Premier League during the January 2008 transfer window.

International career
Lowe made his debut for the Jamaica in 1995. He went on to play at the 1995 Caribbean Cup, scoring in a 2–1 win over Saint Lucia at The National Stadium. He also scored at the 1996 Caribbean Cup, winning Jamaica's consolidation goal in a 3–1 defeat to Suriname at the Hasely Crawford Stadium. He formed a prolific strike partnership with Walter Boyd in the "Reggae Boyz" "Road To France Campaign" in 1998, but then found himself in-and-out of the team for mainly disciplinary reasons. He played two matches at the 1998 World Cup, the 3–1 defeat to Croatia and the 2–1 win over Japan, after being selected by coach René Simões. He went on to score twice in his country's success at the 1998 Caribbean Cup, against Netherlands Antilles in a group win, as well as the only goal of the semi-final clash with Antigua and Barbuda.

He featured in qualification for the 2002 World Cup, scoring against Costa Rica and Trinidad and Tobago in June 2001. He featured in the 2003 CONCACAF Gold Cup, and scored and was then sent off in a 2–0 win over Guatemala at the Miami Orange Bowl. Jamaica went on to lose 5–0 to Mexico at the quarter-final stage. His last international was a March 2004 friendly match against Honduras in which he also scored a goal. During his 2004 drug trial he was suspended from international duty and despite being cleared of the charges in 2005, the 31-year-old Lowe was not selected again. He earned 65 caps for his country.

Legal troubles
Lowe was arrested by British police in April 2004 for trafficking £117,000 worth of crack cocaine, he denied the charges. The exact charge was 'attempting to possess 1.17 kg (2.5 lb) of crack cocaine with intent to supply'. The Prosecution claimed he signed for the package under the fake name of "Kevin Brown" and intended to profit financially from knowingly trafficking the drugs. Lowe countered that the fake name was to avoid paparazzi and that he had no idea about the contents of the package: "I am Jamaican, maybe you think differently. If I am a mate and you said, 'can you do that for me', I am not going to think anything bad of you." Lowe said in a police interview: "I thought he was a friend". In February 2005 he was cleared as the charges were dismissed for lack of evidence.

He was arrested and charged in St Catherine in December 2007 for possession of marijuana. He had been driving a car with 42 marijuana cigarettes, he posted the $300 bail and was released from custody.

Coaching career
After completing his JFF coaching certification, Lowe coached briefly with August Town in the National Premier League.

Career statistics

Club

International

Honours
Jamaica
Caribbean Cup: 1998

Rochester Raging Rhinos
A-League: 2000

Rushden & Diamonds
Football League Third Division: 2002–03

References

External links
 
 Profile and UK career stats at Rushden & Diamonds's official site
 

1974 births
Living people
Sportspeople from Kingston, Jamaica
Association football forwards
Association football sweepers
Association football midfielders
Association football utility players
Jamaican footballers
Jamaica youth international footballers
Jamaica international footballers
Harbour View F.C. players
Jamaican expatriate footballers
Expatriate soccer players in Canada
Jamaican expatriate sportspeople in Canada
Montreal Impact (1992–2011) players
Waterhouse F.C. players
Arnett Gardens F.C. players
Expatriate soccer players in the United States
Jamaican expatriate sportspeople in the United States
Richmond Kickers players
Rochester New York FC players
Sporting Kansas City players
Expatriate footballers in England
Jamaican expatriate sportspeople in England
Port Vale F.C. players
Rushden & Diamonds F.C. players
Coventry City F.C. players
Portmore United F.C. players
Miami FC (2006) players
A-League (1995–2004) players
USL Championship players
English Football League players
Major League Soccer players
USL First Division players
1998 CONCACAF Gold Cup players
1998 FIFA World Cup players
2003 CONCACAF Gold Cup players
Jamaican football managers
August Town F.C. managers
National Premier League players